Sulakshana may refer to:

Sulakshana (actress), South Indian actress
Sulakshana Khatri, Gujarati actress
Sulakshana Naik, cricketer
Sulakshana Pandit, playback singer